Karine Gonthier-Hyndman (born August 8, 1984) is a Canadian actress from Quebec, most noted for her performances in the television series Like-moi, Les Simone, Happily Married (C'est comme ça que je t'aime) and Entre deux draps.

Born in Ottawa, Ontario, she moved to Montreal, Quebec as a teenager. She had a number of supporting roles in film and television before breaking through to wider fame as a cast member of the sketch comedy series Like-moi, which aired from 2015 to 2019. The cast received several nominations for comedy ensemble performance from the Gémeaux Awards, winning in 2018 and 2020. The cast of Entre deux draps won in the same category in 2021.

Her film roles have included First Snow (Première neige), Threesome (Le Trip à trois), Frimas, Falcon Lake and In Broad Daylight (Au grand jour).

Personal life
She is the niece of actor James Hyndman. She was formerly in a relationship with actor Guillaume Girard, who played her husband in Entre deux draps, although they were no longer still together by the time of the series premiere.

References

External links

1984 births
Living people
21st-century Canadian actresses
21st-century Canadian comedians
Canadian film actresses
Canadian stage actresses
Canadian television actresses
Canadian sketch comedians
Canadian women comedians
Actresses from Ottawa
Actresses from Montreal
Franco-Ontarian people
French Quebecers